BKS may refer to:

BKS theory, on interaction of matter and electromagnetic radiation
BKS Air Transport, UK airline 1951-1970
BKS (band), a Canadian techno group created by radio DJ Chris Sheppard, with Hennie Bekker and Greg Kavanagh
BKS, Fatmawati Soekarno Airport IATA code
B. K. S. Iyengar, an Indian yoga expert
Bharatiya Kisan Sangh, Indian organisation of farmers
Station code for Bekasi railway station

See also
BKS Stal Bielsko-Biała, Polish sports club